Danival de Oliveira (born 5 November 1952), commonly known as Danival, is a retired Brazilian footballer who spent most of his career with Clube Atlético Mineiro.

International career
All of Danival's caps and goals came in the 1975 Copa América, where he helped Brazil to third place.

Career statistics

International

International goals
Scores and results list Brazil's goal tally first.

References

External links
 

1952 births
Living people
Brazilian footballers
Brazil international footballers
Association football midfielders
Clube Atlético Mineiro players
Nacional Futebol Clube players
Vila Nova Futebol Clube players
Associação Portuguesa de Desportos players
Sport Club do Recife players
Santa Cruz Futebol Clube players
Atlético Clube Goianiense players
Catuense Futebol players
Clube Náutico Marcílio Dias players
Nacional Atlético Clube (SP) players
Futebol Clube Santa Cruz players